Charles Lewis (21 September 1857 – 28 November 1927) was an independent conservative Member of Parliament in New Zealand.

Early life
Lewis was born in Christchurch on 21 September 1857. His father, David Lewis, was a farmer in Halswell and one of the early settlers of Canterbury. On 25 December 1856, his father had married Annie Gould, a sister of George Gould (G. Gould's son, also George Gould, would thus be Lewis' cousin). His mother Annie died in February 1860 when Lewis was two years old. Lewis attended Christ's College in his home city, and Clifton and Malvern Colleges in England. Upon his return to New Zealand in 1874, he was employed as a farmer in Springfield, Ellesmere, and Brookside, until he inherited his father's farm in Halswell upon his death in 1874.

Political career

Lewis was a member of various local bodies, most importantly the Halswell Road Board.

When William Pember Reeves' appointment as Agent-General to the United Kingdom caused a vacancy in the City of Christchurch electorate, Lewis was on the committee of the National Association (i.e. the opposition) and was part of a small majority that decided that the resulting 1896 by-election should be contested by conservative interests. Together with two others, he was tasked with finding a suitable candidate, and it was him who informed the print media that a conservative candidate would stand. No candidate being found, Lewis saved the situation by consenting to become the candidate himself. Due to vote splitting between liberal candidates, he unexpectedly won the 13 February 1896 by-election.

At the time, sessions regularly extended into the evening or the early morning, sometimes even all night. He missed the last week of the session in 1900 due to exhaustion. During the parliamentary recess, Lewis invited the electorate to a meeting on 3 June 1901 to present his views for the upcoming session. Queen Victoria had died earlier in the year, and the royal tour of Prince George, Duke of Cornwall and York and his wife Mary were about to visit Christchurch, and as The Press noted, there was little interest in politics at the time. Consequently, the speech was poorly attended—only about 60 people turned up—and Lewis was so disappointed about the lack of support by the constituency that on 7 June, he sent his resignation to the Speaker of the House. The resulting by-election was won by George John Smith.

Lewis then represented the Courtenay electorate in Canterbury from 1902 to 1908, when he retired.

Other interests
Lewis had a number of race horses that at times were successful at winning. He was a committee member of the Canterbury A&P Association. He was on the board of governors of Canterbury College and from 1904 to 1907, he was the board's chairman.

Death
Lewis retired to Waipukurau, in the North Island and "died there by his own hand on 28 November 1927. He was nervous and ill at the time".

Notes

References

|-

1857 births
1927 suicides
Members of the New Zealand House of Representatives
New Zealand politicians who committed suicide
People educated at Christ's College, Christchurch
People educated at Clifton College
People educated at Malvern College
Chancellors of the University of Canterbury
New Zealand MPs for Christchurch electorates
New Zealand MPs for South Island electorates
19th-century New Zealand politicians
People from Christchurch